Brough Nunatak is a nunatak in the northwest part of Evans Piedmont Glacier,  west-southwest of Boney Point, Victoria Land.

References 

Nunataks of Victoria Land
Scott Coast